Rohit Rajendra Nair (born 29 March 1990), known as Rohit Nair, is an Indian actor. He made his acting debut in the Malayalam movie Abhiyum Njanum directed by S.P. Mahesh.

Filmography

References 

1990 births
Living people
Male actors from Mumbai
Indian male film actors
21st-century Indian male actors